Mame may refer to:

Arts and entertainment
 Mame (musical), a 1966 Broadway musical by Jerry Herman, and the title character, Mame
 Mame (film), a 1974 American film based on the musical
 Mame (film soundtrack), a soundtrack album 
 MAME, an emulator for arcade games
 Mame Soramame, a fictional character from the anime and manga series Dr. Slump

People
 Mame people or Mam, an indigenous people of Mexico
 Alfred-Henri-Amand Mame (1811-1893), French printer and publisher
 Mame Biram Diouf (born 1987), Senegalese footballer
 Mame Madior Boye (born 1940), former Prime Minister of Senegal
 Mame Niang (born 1984), Senegalese footballer
 Mame Tacko Diouf (born 1976), Senegalese hurdler
 Mame Younousse Dieng, Senegalese writer

Other uses
 Mame, a size classification of bonsai

See also
 Auntie Mame, a novel by Patrick Dennis; basis for the musical
 Auntie Mame (film), a 1958 film based on the novel
 Maim